York Community High School  is a public secondary school in Elmhurst, Illinois, United States. It is a part of the Elmhurst Community Unit School District 205. Most of the students reside in Elmhurst; however, the district also draws a small number of students from Addison, Bensenville, and Oak Brook. York is the only high school in the district, which as a unit school district also includes an early childhood center, eight elementary schools, three middle schools, and a transition center.

History
Prior to 1918, Elmhurst operated a combined high school and grammar school, which was destroyed by fire in December 1917.
York was established in 1918. The building saw many additions from 1950 through 1990, including a third floor, a four-classroom fourth floor, swimming pool, and additional facilities.  In 2000, the voters of District 205 passed a referendum to rebuild the school. Construction started soon after and the new building, which was first opened in 2002, has separate academic, service, student commons and athletics areas (including a new fieldhouse).

Academics
In 2017, York had an average composite ACT score of 24.5 and graduated 95.5% of its senior class. In 2017, 54% of the senior class had taken at least one Advanced Placement exam during high school, and of those who took an exam in 2017, 91% passed at least one of their exams. In 2011, Newsweek ranked York Community High School 257 out of 500 in its annual list of America's Best High Schools. Overall, according to the US News 2017 High School rankings, York Community High School is ranked 687 of all public high schools in the United States and ranked 18 of all high schools in the state of Illinois.

Athletics

York High School competes in the West Suburban Conference.  The school is also a member of the Illinois High School Association (IHSA), which governs most sports and competitive activities in Illinois. Rob Wagner is the current athletic director at York High School.

The school sponsors interscholastic teams for young men and women in basketball, cross country, golf, gymnastics, soccer, swimming & diving, tennis, track & field, volleyball, cheerleading, and water polo. Young men may compete in baseball, football, and wrestling, while young women may compete in badminton, bowling, dance, and softball. While not sponsored by the IHSA, the school also sponsors teams for young men and women in lacrosse, and a poms team for young women. Also while not sponsored by the IHSA, York has a men's hockey team.

York Community High School's athletic program was ranked 17th overall in the nation by ESPN RISE's FAB 50 list.

York Community High School's men's cross country team has won 28 state championships under coach Joe Newton: 1962, 1965, 1968, 1971, 1972, 1973, 1978AA, 1980AA, 1981AA, 1982AA, 1983AA, 1984AA, 1986AA, 1989AA, 1990AA, 1991AA, 1992AA, 1993AA, 1994AA, 1999AA, 2000AA, 2002AA, 2003AA, 2004AA, 2005AA, 2006AA, 2010-3A, and 2012-3A. He retired in 2016 because of problems with mobility and movement from his home to practice. Currently, the team's head coach is Charlie Kern. The head coach of the women's cross country team is Lauren DeAngelis.

Arts
York Community High School offers a variety of performing arts programs. Its music program includes a full orchestra, three individual orchestras, three full bands, and three concert choirs. Students have the opportunity to join music groups such as Jazz Band, a cappella singing groups, and percussion ensembles. Musicians have the opportunity to compete annually in the Illinois Music Educators Association (ILMEA) competition; students are chosen to go first to a District level concert, and if chosen they can also continue to go to ILMEA State, held in Peoria, Illinois. York also has a theater department that puts on three productions a year. The drama department went to the Illinois High School Musical Theater Awards (IHSMTA) in 2017 for their production of "West Side Story" and received the award of Best Production in the state. The dance programs at York include the Advanced Dance Class and the York Dance Company. Many clubs surround art as well, through painting, photography, drawing, or other forms of art.

Notable alumni
 Travis Nelson Murphy  is the most successful Olympic luger, having won six gold medals and a bronze attained in four consecutive Olympics (three golds and a bronze in singles, and 3 golds in team relay).
David Cohn (born 1995), American-Israeli basketball player 
 Martin Forest Eberhard (born 1960) is an American engineer and business executive. He founded Tesla, Inc. (then Tesla Motors).
 Lee A. Daniels was an Illinois State Representative (1975–2006), who served as Speaker of the State House (1995–97).
 George J. Eade was a United States Air Force four-star general.
 Robert Goldsborough (1955), murder mystery novelist.
 Ron Guenther is a former athletic director for the University of Illinois at Urbana-Champaign.
 Garth Lagerwey, a former professional soccer player who is currently an executive with Real Salt Lake.
Fred Lorenzen, former stock car driver and member of the NASCAR Hall of Fame.
 Timothy P. Marshall (1974), civil engineer and meteorologist, tornado expert, pioneering storm chaser
 Betty Okino is an actress and former gymnast. She was a member of the bronze medal-winning gymnastics team at the 1992 Summer Olympics.
 Ken Paulson is the president and chief operating officer of the Freedom Forum, Newseum and Diversity Institute; he is the former editor and senior vice president/news of USA Today and USATODAY.com.
 Gary Rydstrom is a multi-Academy Award winning sound mixer, sound effects editor, and director. His work in sound includes films such as Backdraft, Terminator 2: Judgment Day, and Jurassic Park.
 Donald Sage was an All-American cross country and track runner for Stanford University.
 Ian Michael Smith is an actor, known for his starring role in Simon Birch.  Graduated in 2005.
 Floyd Swink was a botanist and author of books on the flora of the Chicago region. 
 Tim Stratton was a tight end at Purdue University and was the inaugural winner of the John Mackey Award (2000), presented annually to Division 1A's best tight end.

Notable staff
 Joe Newton was the boys cross country coach from 1959 to 2016. He was also the boys track & field coach, having coached state championship teams in both sports.  He was a member of the National Federation of State High School Associations (NFSHS) Hall of Fame. He was also an assistant marathon coach at the 1988 Seoul Olympics

See also
 List of high schools in Illinois

References

External links
 York Community High School - Official Site
 Long Green Line - Documentary film about York High School's boys cross country program

Public high schools in Illinois
Educational institutions established in 1918
Elmhurst, Illinois
Schools in DuPage County, Illinois
1918 establishments in Illinois